Tremont Nail Factory District is a historic district in Wareham, Massachusetts. It makes up the area occupied by the former Tremont Nail Company. In the early 19th century, Parker Mills was constructed by shipwrights as a cotton mill. During the War of 1812, it was partially burned by the British. In 1819, another building was constructed on the site of the former mill by Isaac and Jared Pratt to manufacture nails. At this time, the Parker Mills Nail Company was born. The mill was partially destroyed by fire again in 1836. Reconstruction was completed in 1848, and the buildings haven't changed much since. The bell in the cupola in the original facility bears a date of 1851. The main mill is one of five buildings at the site over 100 years old. There are also 60 nail machines in the building, many over 125 years old. Until the 1920s, the mill was also powered by a water wheel which powered overhead shafting.

The district was added to the National Register of Historic Places in 1976.

See also
Bridgewater Iron Works
National Register of Historic Places listings in Plymouth County, Massachusetts
Old Colony Iron Works-Nemasket Mills Complex

References

External links

Historic American Engineering Record in Massachusetts
Historic districts in Plymouth County, Massachusetts
National Register of Historic Places in Plymouth County, Massachusetts
Industrial archaeological sites in the United States
Industrial buildings and structures in Massachusetts
Fastening tool manufacturers
Historic districts on the National Register of Historic Places in Massachusetts
Nail (fastener)